Sounds Like Zeus is the debut EP by Canadian indie band Zeus.  It was released 2 June 2009 on the Arts & Crafts label.  The EP was recorded at Ill Eagle Studio and mixed at The Cracker Pit.

The EP includes a cover of the Genesis song "That's All".

In a positive review of the EP, critic Vish Khanna called the band "one of the sunniest additions to the Arts & Crafts roster", and wrote that "'Marching Through Your Head' is a strong contender for pop song of the year." Graham Kennedy of Chart magazine listed the EP among his top ten favourite albums of 2009.

Track listing
All songs written by Zeus (Rob Drake, Carlin Nicholson, Mike O'Brien, Neil Quin) except where noted.

"How Does It Feel" – 2:52
"Marching Through Your Head" – 2:25
"I Know" – 3:15
"That's All" (Tony Banks, Phil Collins, Mike Rutherford) – 3:15
"Cornerstones" – 3:56

Personnel
 Rob Drake
 Carlin Nicholson
 Mike O'Brien
 Neil Quin
 Chris Marshall – photography
 Robbie Lackritz – mixing
 Phil Bova – mastering

References

2009 debut EPs
Zeus (band) albums
Indie rock EPs
EPs by Canadian artists